Linda Washington Cropp (born October 5, 1947) is an American politician from Washington, D.C., the capital of the United States. She was a Democratic member of the Council of the District of Columbia, where she was the first woman to serve as the elected Council Chairman. On September 12, 2006, she lost the Democratic Primary for Mayor (57% to 31%) to Adrian Fenty. This loss came in spite of the fact that Cropp had been endorsed by outgoing mayor Anthony A. Williams. She was succeeded as Council Chairman by Vincent C. Gray.

Early life and education
Cropp received a bachelor's degree in government from Howard University in 1969. In 1971, she received a Master of Education degree in guidance and counseling from Howard University. She was a student-teacher at Eastern Senior High School, where she met her husband. In 2002, Cropp received an Honorary Doctor of Humane Letters degree from the University of the District of Columbia and was awarded an Honorary Doctorate in Philosophy from the George Washington University in 2007.

Career
From 1970 to 1978, Cropp worked as a teacher and a counselor with the District of Columbia Public Schools.

In 1979, she ran for the District of Columbia Board of Education to represent Ward 4. At the time, she was a guidance counselor at Roosevelt Senior High School. Her candidacy was supported by then-Mayor Marion Barry. Cropp won the election, defeating opponent Victoria T. Street.

Cropp started her first term representing Ward 4 on the D.C. Board of Education in 1980. She was elected vice president of the Board of Education in December 1984, and then president in January 1989.

In 1988, Cropp ran to represent Ward 4 on the Council of the District of Columbia. Cropp criticized incumbent Charlene Drew Jarvis, saying Jarvis had too much allegiance to big businesses because they were the source of the great majority of her campaign contributions. Cropp also said that Jarvis had not done enough to help small businesses along Georgia Avenue. Jarvis criticized Cropp for the disappointing results of public schools under Cropp's leadership of the Board of Education. The editorial board of The Washington Post endorsed Jarvis' reelection. Cropp was defeated by Jarvis in the Democratic Party Primary Election, 47% to 52%.
When Council Member Betty Ann Kane decided not to run for reelection to her at-large seat in 1990, Cropp ran to replace her. The editorial board of the Washington Post endorsed the campaign of her opponent, Johnny Barnes. Cropp won the Democratic Party primary election, receiving 51 percent of the vote; Johnny Barnes received 27 percent, and Terry Lynch received 22 percent. Cropp went on to win the general election with 38 percent of the vote.

 1992 elected as chair of the Councilors Committee on Human Services
 1994 re-elected at-large member of D.C. Council
 1997 named acting Chairman of D.C. Council, following the death of David Clarke
 1997 elected D.C. Council Chairman in a special election
 1998 re-elected D.C. Council Chairman
 2002 re-elected D.C. Council Chairman
 2006 entered race for Mayor

After her 2006 loss, Cropp retired from politics.  Cropp joined the board of two not-for-profit companies, the Community Preservation and Development Corp. and CareFirst BlueCross BlueShield, and also volunteered for two other local charities, Capital City Links and the D.C. chapter of Boys Town.  In 2013 CareFirst BlueCross BlueShield promoted her to chairman of the board.

Personal life
Cropp is married to Dwight S. Cropp, a doctor of public policy with a Ph.D. from George Washington University. She has two children, Allison and Christopher, and a grandson, Christian Alexander. She lives in Crestwood in Washington, D.C.

References

External links
 Biography
 Metro Weekly interview

Members of the Council of the District of Columbia
Members of the District of Columbia Board of Education
Living people
Howard University alumni
African-American people in Washington, D.C., politics
African-American women in politics
Politicians from Atlanta
1947 births
2004 United States presidential electors
Delta Sigma Theta members
Women city councillors in the District of Columbia
21st-century American women politicians
21st-century American politicians
20th-century American women politicians
20th-century American politicians
African-American city council members
20th-century African-American women
20th-century African-American politicians
21st-century African-American women
21st-century African-American politicians